Justin Scott Atchley (born September 5, 1973) is a former American Major League Baseball pitcher. He played for the Cincinnati Reds during the  season. He attended Sedro-Woolley High School, Texas A&M University and Walla Walla Community College.

References

1973 births
Living people
Baseball players from Washington (state)
Cincinnati Reds players
Major League Baseball pitchers
Walla Walla Warriors baseball players
Billings Mustangs players
Charleston AlleyCats players
Winston-Salem Warthogs players
Chattanooga Lookouts players
Indianapolis Indians players
Louisville RiverBats players
Rochester Red Wings players
Louisville Bats players
Texas A&M Aggies baseball players
People from Sedro-Woolley, Washington